Xinshi is a railway station on the Taiwan Railways Administration West Coast line located in Sinshih District, Tainan, Taiwan.

Around the station
 Far East University
Taiwan High Speed Rail passes through Xinshi railway station and was originally a proposed location for Tainan's HSR station, but the plan was cancelled and today's Tainan HSR station is located in the southeastern Gueiren District.

See also

 List of railway stations in Taiwan

References

Railway stations served by Taiwan Railways Administration
Railway stations in Kaohsiung
Railway stations opened in 1905
1905 establishments in Taiwan